Vincenzo Peruggia (8 October 1881 8 October 1925) was an Italian museum worker, artist, and thief, most famous for stealing the Mona Lisa from the Louvre museum in Paris on 21 August 1911.

Theft

In 1911, Peruggia perpetrated what has been described as the greatest art theft of the 20th century. It was a police theory that the former Louvre worker hid inside the museum on Sunday, 20 August, knowing the museum would be closed the following day. But, according to Peruggia's interrogation in Florence after his arrest, he entered the museum on Monday, 21 August around 7 am, through the door where the other Louvre workers were entering. He said he wore one of the white smocks that museum employees customarily wore and was indistinguishable from the other workers. When the Salon Carré, where the Mona Lisa hung, was empty, he lifted the painting off the four iron pegs that secured it to the wall and took it to a nearby service staircase. There, he removed the protective case and frame. Some people report that he concealed the painting (which Leonardo painted on wood) under his smock. , so it would not fit under a smock worn by someone his size. Instead, he said he took off his smock and wrapped it around the painting, tucked it under his arm, and left the Louvre through the same door he had entered.

Peruggia hid the painting in his apartment in Paris.

After keeping the painting hidden in a trunk in his apartment for two years, Peruggia returned to Italy with it. He kept it in his apartment in Florence, Italy for some time. However, Peruggia eventually grew impatient and was finally caught when he contacted Mario Fratelli, the owner of an art gallery in Florence. Fratelli's story conflicts with Peruggia's, but it was clear that Peruggia expected a reward for returning the painting to what he regarded as its "homeland". Fratelli called in Giovanni Poggi, director of the Uffizi Gallery, who authenticated the painting. Poggi and Fratelli, after taking the painting for "safekeeping", informed the police, who arrested Peruggia at his hotel. After its recovery, the painting was exhibited all over Italy with banner headlines rejoicing its return. The Mona Lisa was then returned to the Louvre in 1913. While the painting was famous before the theft, the notoriety it received from the newspaper headlines and the large scale police investigation helped the artwork become one of the best known in the world, gaining considerable public interest.

Motivations
There are currently two predominant theories regarding the theft of the Mona Lisa. Peruggia said he did it for a patriotic reason: he wanted to bring the painting back for display in Italy "after it was stolen by Napoleon" (when Peruggia worked at the Louvre, he learned of how Napoleon plundered many Italian works of art during the Napoleonic Wars). Although perhaps sincere in his motive, Vincenzo may not have known that Leonardo da Vinci took this painting as a gift for Francis I when he moved to France to become a painter in his court during the 16th century, 250 years before Napoleon's birth.

Experts have questioned the 'patriotism' motive on the grounds that—if 'patriotism' was the true motive—Peruggia would have donated the painting to an Italian museum, rather than have attempted to profit from its sale. The question of money is also confirmed by letters that Peruggia sent to his father after the theft. On 22 December 1911, four months after the theft, he wrote that Paris was where "I will make my fortune and that his (fortune) will arrive in one shot."  The following year (1912), he wrote: "I am making a vow for you to live long and enjoy the prize that your son is about to realize for you and for all our family."

Put on trial, the court agreed, to some extent, that Peruggia committed his crime for patriotic reasons and gave him a lenient sentence. He was sent to jail for one year and 15 days, but was hailed as a great patriot in Italy and served only seven months in jail.

Another theory emerged later. The theft may have been encouraged or masterminded by Eduardo de Valfierno, a con man who had commissioned the French art forger Yves Chaudron to make copies of the painting so he could sell them as the missing original. The copies would have gone up in value if the original were stolen. This theory is based entirely on a 1932 article by former Hearst journalist  Karl Decker in The Saturday Evening Post. Decker claimed to have known Valfierno and heard the story from him in 1913, promising not to print it until he learned of Valfierno's death. There is no external confirmation for this theory.

Later life
Peruggia was released from jail after a short time and served in the Italian army during World War I. During the war, he was captured by Austria-Hungary and held as a POW for two years until the war ended and he was released. He later married, had one daughter, Celestina, returned to France, and continued to work as a painter decorator using his birth name Pietro Peruggia. He died on 8 October 1925 (his 44th birthday) in the Paris suburb of Saint-Maur-des-Fossés, France. He was buried in the Condé Cemetery of Saint-Maur-des-Fossés. Sometime in the 1950s, Peruggia's remains were exhumed and relocated into the cemetery bonelocker.

His death in 1925 was not widely reported by the media at the time, possibly because he died under the name of Pietro Peruggia; obituaries appeared mistakenly only when another Vincenzo Peruggia died in Haute-Savoie in 1947.

Portrayals
In Der Raub der Mona Lisa (1931), an early German sound film, he was portrayed by Willi Forst.
In The Man Who Stole La Gioconda (it) (2006), a television miniseries, he was portrayed by Alessandro Preziosi.
 In an April 1956 episode of the TV show You Are There, called "The Recovery of the Mona Lisa (December 10, 1913)", Peruggia is played by Vito Scotti, who reprised the role in another TV reconstruction of the famous theft, this time for the TV-show G.E. True. The episode was called "The Tenth Mona Lisa" and aired in March 1963.
In a 2018 episode of Drunk History on Comedy Central, he was portrayed by Jack Black.

See also
 Kempton Bunton
 The Art of the Steal  (2013)

References

Sources
 Hoobler, Dorothy and Thomas, The Crimes of Paris New York: Little, Brown, 2009, pp. 3–7, 305–314.
 Kuper, Simon, "Who Stole the Mona Lisa?  The World's Most Famous Art Heist, 100 Years On," Slate, 7 August 2011. 
 Newsweek, "The Mona Lisa Thief," 29 September 1947, p. 97.

Further reading
 "The Theft of the Mona Lisa: On Stealing the Worlds Most Famous Painting" (2011, ARCA Publications), a monography by Noah Charney
Mona Lisa Is Missing (formerly The Missing Piece), a 2012 documentary by Joe Medeiros
"The Mystery of the Misplaced Mona Lisa," a short mystery story by Ron Katz, https://www.thesleuthingsilvers.com

External links
 Vanity Fair – May 2009. "Stealing Mona Lisa" by Dorothy and Thomas Hoobler
 Saturday Evening Post: 100 Years Ago: The Mastermind Behind the Mona Lisa Heist

Art thieves
Italian thieves
People convicted of theft
1881 births
1925 deaths
Mona Lisa
20th-century Italian painters
Italian male painters
Italian expatriates in France
20th-century Italian criminals